Dominique Auprètre (born 1 January 1958 in Cognac) is a French sport shooter. She competed in rifle shooting events at the 1988 Summer Olympics.

Olympic results

References

1958 births
Living people
ISSF rifle shooters
French female sport shooters
Shooters at the 1988 Summer Olympics
Olympic shooters of France
People from Cognac, France
Sportspeople from Charente